Saxtead Green is a village on the A1120 road and the B1119 road, near the village of Saxtead and the town of Framlingham, in the East Suffolk district, in the English county of Suffolk.


See also 
 Saxtead
 Saxtead Green Windmill

References 
Suffolk A-Z (page 90)

Villages in Suffolk